Paladins in Troubled Times is a 2008 Chinese television series adapted from Liang Yusheng's novel Datang Youxia Zhuan. The series was produced by Zhang Jizhong, and starred Victor Huang, Shen Xiaohai, Sattawat Sethakorn, He Zhuoyan, Liu Tianyue and Lu Chen. It was first broadcast on CCTV in 2008.

Plot
The story is set in the Tianbao era during the reign of Emperor Xuanzong of the Tang dynasty. Dou Lingkan, the leader of the Flying Tiger Mountain Gang, and his godson Tie Mole are passing through a small town when they are attracted by a commotion. They realise that Wang Longke, a servant of the warlord An Lushan, is planning to steal a letter from Guo Ziyi's messenger. Apparently, Guo Ziyi discovered An Lushan's plans to rebel against the imperial court and he wants to warn the emperor. Tie Mole saves the messenger and becomes involved in the politics of that era. He is joined by several righteous martial artists as they attempt to undermine An Lushan's rebellion.

Cast

 Victor Huang as Tie Mole
 Shen Xiaohai as Wang Longke
 Sattawat Sethakorn as Kongkong'er / Duan Keye
 He Zhuoyan as Wang Yanyu / Shi Hongmei
 Liu Tianyue as Xia Lingshuang
 Lu Chen as Han Zhifen
 Wang Jiusheng as Jingjing'er
 Ba Yin as Yang Mulao / Tie Kunlun / Huangfu Song
 Tong Chun-chung as Emperor Xuanzong of Tang
 Wang Gang as Qin Xiang
 Chen Jiming as Duan Guizhang
 He Sirong as Dou Xianniang
 Tu Men as An Lushan
 Li Zefeng as An Qingxu
 Rocky Hou as An Qingzong
 Yang Niansheng as Han Zhan
 Zhang Baijun as Dou Lingkan
 Wang Jianguo as Guo Ziyi
 Hu Qingshi as Gao Lishi
 Liu Peizhong as Yang Guozhong
 Gao Yuan as Imperial Concubine Yang
 Jiang Hualin as Geshu Han
 Wang Yuzhi as Wang Yanyu's wet nurse
 Ren Baocheng as Du Qianyun
 Zhao Qiang as Zhang Xun
 Chen Panjing as Duan Fei
 Xi Xianfeng as Liu Da
 Zhang Hengping as Blacksmith
 Shi Tongcui as Blacksmith's wife
 Liu Bing as Liu'er
 Li Yuchen as Gou'er
 Zhang Xueying as Hua'er
 Cheng Hongjun as Shi Yiru
 Li Yuan as Mobei Heibao
 Xu Hongzhou as Cui Qianyou
 Song Songlin as Huobo Guiren
 Zhao Shuijin as Li Heng
 Gong Zhixi as Wang Botong
 Tian Yu as Madam Wang
 Tian Haipeng as Opera troupe master

External links
  Paladins in Troubled Times on Sohu
  Paladins in Troubled Times on Sina.com
  Paladins in Troubled Times page on CNTV's website

Chinese wuxia television series
Television shows based on works by Liang Yusheng
2008 Chinese television series debuts
Television series set in the Tang dynasty
2008 Chinese television series endings
Mandarin-language television shows
China Central Television original programming